Sisleide do Amor Lima (born 2 June 1967), commonly known as Sissi, is a Brazilian footballer and coach who played as an attacking midfielder. She last played for FC Gold Pride of Women's Professional Soccer and is a former member of the Brazil women's national football team.

Early life
Born in Esplanada, Brazil, Sissi began playing football at the age of six with her older brother Paulo and her father. At the age of 14, she left her home in Esplanada to play professionally in Salvador, Brazil. She played for the first time with the Brazilian national team at age 16. In 1999 she transferred from São Paulo FC to Palmeiras for a US$5,000 fee.

Club career

San Jose CyberRays (2001-2003) 
Sissi played for the San Jose CyberRays in the first women's professional soccer league in the United States, the Women's United Soccer Association (WUSA) all three years that the league was in existence. The team won the Founders Cup Championship in their first year together.

California Storm (2004-2014) 
In 2004, Sissi signed to play with the California Storm in the Women's Premier Soccer League, the highest women's professional soccer league in the United States after the WUSA ceased operations. She joined fellow 1999 Women's World Cup stars, Brandi Chastain and Keri Sanchez.

Saad Esporte Club (2005) 
In November 2005, Sissi made a brief return to one of her former clubs in Brazil, Saad Esporte Clube.

FC Gold Pride (2009) 
Sissi signed with FC Gold Pride for the inaugural season of Women's Professional Soccer (WPS) as the team's assistant coach. On 11 June 2009, it was announced that Sissi was joining the roster of the team, making her the oldest player in the league at age 42. She made three appearances as a player for the club playing a total of 128 minutes. She was also an assistant coach.

International career
Sissi was part of the EC Radar club team who represented Brazil at the 1988 FIFA Women's Invitation Tournament in Guangdong and finished in third place. She was unable to take part in the inaugural 1991 FIFA Women's World Cup because she was not released by her club team.

Sissi was called up to Brazil's squad for the 1999 FIFA Women's World Cup as a Palmeiras player. She won the golden boot award at the tournament in which she scored seven goals, sharing the award with China's Sun Wen.

Coaching career
On 29 September 2008, Sissi was announced as the new assistant coach for the Bay Area Women's Professional Soccer team, ultimately known as FC Gold Pride. She was also the head coach for the Las Positas College Women's Soccer team based in Livermore, California. She was a coach for the Diablo Valley Soccer Club (DVSC) for three years as well as Clayton Valley High School. She currently coaches at Walnut Creek Soccer Club and at Solano Community College in Fairfield, California, USA.

References

External links

FC Gold Pride player profile
San Jose CyberRays player profile
Walnut Creek Soccer Club coach profile

1967 births
Living people
Brazilian expatriate sportspeople in the United States
Brazilian women's footballers
Olympic footballers of Brazil
Footballers at the 1996 Summer Olympics
Footballers at the 2000 Summer Olympics
1995 FIFA Women's World Cup players
1999 FIFA Women's World Cup players
FC Gold Pride players
San Jose CyberRays players
Expatriate women's soccer players in the United States
Women's United Soccer Association players
Brazil women's international footballers
Brazilian expatriate women's footballers
Sportspeople from Bahia
Women's association football midfielders
Saad Esporte Clube (women) players
California Storm players
Women's Premier Soccer League players
São Paulo FC (women) players
Sociedade Esportiva Palmeiras (women) players
Women's Professional Soccer players